North Carolina Highway 308 (NC 308) is a primary state highway in the U.S. state of North Carolina. It serves mainly to connect the city of Windsor to communities and towns in eastern Bertie County.

Route description
NC 308 is a two-lane rural highway that traverses  from US 258 and NC 561 near Rich Square to NC 32 in Pleasant Grove. The highway provides a direct link for Roxobel, Kelford, and Lewiston Woodville to Windsor, the county seat of Bertie County. Continuing east, it crosses the Roanoke River, forms a concurrency with NC 45 and North Carolina Bicycle Route 3, then connects the communities of Westover and Mackeys, before ending at NC 32 in Pleasant Grove.

Scenic byways
The byway is noted for historical homes in Edenton, the Sans Souci Ferry, the scenic river and coastal views, and history.

History
Established in 1933 as a new primary routing, it went from US 258/NC 12 near Rich Square to NC 30 (today's US 13 Business) at Granville Street in Windsor. In 1975, NC 308 was extended east to NC 45. Between 1980 and 1982, NC 308 was extended again to its current eastern terminus in Pleasant Grove.

Junction list

Special routes

Windsor truck route

North Carolina Highway 308 Truck (NC 308 Truck) is a  route that bypasses southeast of downtown Windsor.  It overlaps at first with US 13 and US 17, then with US 17 Business.

References

External links

308
Transportation in Northampton County, North Carolina
Transportation in Bertie County, North Carolina
Transportation in Washington County, North Carolina
Historic Albemarle Tour